The following is a list of artists and bands associated with the city pop music genre during the late 1970s and 1980s (not necessarily solely city pop artists).

Groups and artists with aliases are listed by the first letter in their name, and individuals are listed by their surname.

Casiopea
Anri
Haruomi Hosono
Toshiki Kadomatsu
Miki Matsubara
Yumi Matsutoya
Meiko Nakahara
Eiichi Ohtaki
Taeko Ohnuki
Hiroshi Sato (musician)
Seiko Matsuda
Omega Tribe (Japanese band)
T-Square (band)
Masayoshi Takanaka 
Mariya Takeuchi
Akira Terao 
Tomoko Aran
Makoto Matsushita
Piper
Mayumi Yamamoto (CINDY)
Junko Ohashi
Junko Yagami 
Rainych
Mai Yamane
Takako Mamiya
Tatsuro Yamashita
Minako Yoshida
Yasuha
Yerin Baek
Yukiko Okada
Yukika Teramoto

References

City pop artists
1970s in Japanese music
1980s in Japanese music